The 1953 Soviet football championship was the 21st seasons of competitive football in the Soviet Union and the 15th among teams of sports societies and factories. Spartak Moscow won the championship becoming the Soviet domestic champions for the fifth time and tying with the Army team and Dinamo.

Honours

Notes = Number in parentheses is the times that club has won that honour. * indicates new record for competition

Soviet Union football championship

Class A

Class B (second stage)

For places 1-6

Sep 13–27, Gorkiy

For places 7-9

For places 10-12
 
Sep 27 - Oct 1, Baku

For places 13-15
 [Oct 11, Riga] 
 Daugava Riga  2-0 Avangard Chelyabinsk 
 Dinamo Alma-Ata withdrew.

For places 16-18
 
Sep 29 – Oct 3, Kishinev

For places 19-21
 
Sep 27 – Oct 1, Sverdlovsk

For places 22-24
 
Sep 26–29, Dnepropetrovsk

For places 25-27
 
Sep 25–29, Moskva

Top goalscorers

Class A
Nikita Simonyan (Spartak Moscow), Avtandil Gogoberidze (Dinamo Tbilisi) – 14 goals

References

External links
 1953 Soviet football championship. RSSSF